Chhichayuq (Quechua chhicha thick-soled shoe, -yuq a suffix, "the one with a thick-soled shoe", also spelled Chichayoj) is a  mountain in the Bolivian Andes. It is located in the Chuquisaca Department, Azurduy Province, Tarvita Municipality. Chhichayuq lies northwest of Wisk'achani and northeast of Wallqayuq Urqu. The Qucha Mayu ("lake river"), which downstream is named San José originates northwest of the mountain. It is a left tributary of the Pillku Mayu (Quechua for "red river").

References 

Mountains of Chuquisaca Department